Niklas Andersson (born March 5, 1986) is a professional Swedish ice hockey player. He is currently a defenceman for Alba-Volán in the EBEL.

Career statistics

External links

1986 births
Fehérvár AV19 players
Almtuna IS players
Djurgårdens IF Hockey players
Living people
Swedish ice hockey defencemen
Ice hockey people from Stockholm
Swedish expatriate sportspeople in Hungary
Swedish expatriate ice hockey people
Expatriate ice hockey players in Hungary